Andro Hart (died December 1621), or Andrew Hart, was a Scottish printer, publisher, and bookseller in Edinburgh.

Biography
Hart occupied a shop on the north side of the High Street, opposite the mercat cross at the head of Craig's Close. It is described in his will as 'the heich  within his foir tenement of land upon the north syd of the Hie Streit.' The site was subsequently occupied by the shops of William Creech and Archibald Constable. Hart's printing-house was further down the close on the same side of the street. Hart was the principal printer, publisher, and bookseller of his time in Edinburgh. He published the works of Sir William Alexander and of Drummond of Hawthornden, by both of whom he was much respected. On 9 November 1618, Drayton the poet stated in a letter to Drummond that he was seeking to arrange with Hart for the publication of the last part of his 'Poly-Olbion.' Drummond was earnest with Hart 'in that particular', but the negotiation came to nothing. Hart brought out an admirable edition of the Bible in 1610 and also an edition of Barbour's 'Bruce.' He imported a large number of books from abroad. In a petition to the privy council on 10 February 1589–90, he and John Norton, an Englishman, state that for about two years they had imported books from 'Almanie and Germany,' with the result that Edinburgh was better supplied with books than ever before, and as 'gude-chaip as they are to be sold in London or any other part of England.' Their complaint led the council to abandon a projected new duty on imported books. In 1596, Hart was, on the accusation of a debtor, apprehended as one of the leaders of the tumult in the streets of Edinburgh on 17 December, and on the 23rd Hart was committed to ward but was probably liberated soon afterwards. In October 1599, one Edward Cathkyn became surety for Hart, who is described as 'liberar, burges of Edinburgh,' in a suit with John Gibson, 'buik binder'. He died in December 1621. He first married Janet Micklehill and second married Janet Kene, who died on 3 May 1642. By his first wife, he had a son Samuel, and by his second two sons, John and Andrew. There were also several daughters. In his will, he enjoined ''. An autograph of Hart is noticed in 'Notes and Queries'.

References

External links
Account of Andro Hart

Year of birth unknown
1621 deaths
17th-century Scottish people
Scottish booksellers
Scottish printers